Rajat may refer to:

 Rajʽa (also spelled rajʽat) refers to the Second Coming in Islamic terminology
 Rajat Gupta, American businessman
 Rajat Kapoor, Indian actor and director
 Rajat Neogy, Ugandan writer
 Rajat Tokas, Indian actor